Electrofringe is a presenting platform for experimental electronic and technology-based art in Australia. Electrofringe is a non-profit arts organisation and annual festival.

Overview
Electrofringe hosts exhibitions and events throughout the year, focussing on experimental electronic and tech-based art. By putting artists and their works in the same place at the same time, exchange and development of ideas is fostered.

History
Electrofringe was established in 1998 by Nick Ritarr and Sean Healy as part of the Newcastle Fringe Festival.

From 2001 to 2011, the Electrofringe Festival was presented as a five-day annual festival in Newcastle, NSW as part of a group of festivals which come together under the banner of This is Not Art (TiNA).

In 2012, Electrofringe took a break from TiNA to celebrate its 15th year with a change in focus and a new direction.

From 2013 Electrofringe developed its programming model to incorporate a year-round calendar of events. Examples of Electrofringe’s year-round program activities include:

2018 - EF18: Your Privacy is Very Important To Us, 15 September, 107 Projects

2018 - ElectroLab Pop-Up Space for Electronic Arts, 1 February – 31 May, William Street Creative Hub, Sydney

2017 - EF17 Art + Technology Showcase, 4 November, 107 Projects, Sydney

2017 - DIASPAR Music Showcase as part of the Vivid Music Series, June, 107 Projects, Sydney

2016 - Electrofringe presents EF16 Showcase of Creative Technology, 22–23 October, 107 Projects, Sydney

2015 - Electrofringe EF15 showcase, 107 Projects, Sydney

2015 - Electrofringe @ IRL - An interactive exhibition exploring the spaces where the real and virtual collide, presented at Brisbane Powerhouse as part of IRL Digital Festival.

2015 - Game Set Patch - An afternoon of art and sports at Tempe Jets, presented in association with Brand X.

2014 - Electrolapse BYOB - Founded by notorious internet artist Rafael Rozendaal in 2011, Bring Your Own Beamer (BYOB) is an international phenomenon where artists are invited to bring their own projector to the event and screen work on any available surface. Electrolapse BYOB was a two-day event that took place at Pier 2/3 Walsh Bay, as part of Vivid Ideas.

2013 Electrofringe Showcase - Presented at the Hunter St TAFE as part of TiNA, the Showcase brought together 25 of the most exciting and innovative new media and electronic art projects from around Australia and internationally. Exhibiting artists were presented with their artworks, giving audiences the opportunity to explore, experience, interact and provide feedback.

2013 - Electrolapse - A 30-minute collection of new experimental video art which addressed the themes of system failure, manipulation, distortion and opportunity. It was part of an exhibition titled If A System Fails In A Forest... presented by ISEA (International Symposium of Electronic Art).

2013 - Electrofringe in Townsville – An electronic arts exhibition of cutting edge Australian artists curated by Electrofringe and the School of Creative Arts in partnership with eMerge Media Space, School of Creative Arts, James Cook University, and Cereal Box (Renew Townsville).

2010 - Best of Electrofringe Showcase at Campbelltown Arts Centre - Performances from artists from the 2010 Electrofringe program.

2009 - Cellsbutton #3 Festival, Yoyakarta, Indonesia – Artistic Director represented Electrofringe at the festival presenting a talk. A screening of works from Electrofringe was also shown.

2008 - Elektra Festival, Montreal – Artistic Director represented Electrofringe at the festival presenting a seminar.

2007 - A workshop in Sydney with international artists Troika Ranch Dance Theatre, New York was offered to local artists. Artists also travelled from Newcastle, Adelaide and Melbourne to attend. The workshop was on the use of interactive audio-visual software in live installations and performances.

2007 - Japan Media Arts Festival – Artistic Director represented Electrofringe at the festival presenting a talk. A film screening of works from Electrofringe was shown for a month at the festival exhibition.

From 2004 to 2008, Electrofringe collaborated with The Night Air, a sound collage program on ABC Radio National, to remix and showcase content from the festival and, in some years, broadcasting live from the Electrofringe Festival.

Funding
As a sponsored organisation, Electrofringe has received grants from:
Australia Council for the Arts, Visual Arts Board, Music Board, New Media Arts Board, Inter Arts Office, Australian Film Commission, New South Wales Film and Television Office, Department of Communication and, Information Technology and the Arts, Visions Australia Fund, City of Sydney.

As an independent company Electrofringe has received several grants for artistic activities, most recently from the following bodies: Australia Council's Visual Arts Board and Music Board, Screen NSW (previously the NSW Film and Television Office), Arts NSW (now Create NSW), and Townsville City Council.

References

External links

Music festivals established in 2001
Companies established in 1997
New media art festivals
Arts festivals in Australia